The All-Ireland Senior Hurling Championship 1945 was the 59th series of the All-Ireland Senior Hurling Championship, Ireland's premier hurling knock-out competition.  Tipperary won the championship, beating Kilkenny 5-6 to 3-6 in the final.

Format

The All-Ireland Senior Hurling Championship was run on a provincial basis as usual.  All games were played on a knockout basis whereby once a team lost they were eliminated from the championship.  The format for the All-Ireland series of games ran as follows: 
 The winners of the Leinster Championship advanced directly to the first All-Ireland semi-final.  
 Galway, a team who faced no competition in the Connacht Championship, entered the championship at the All-Ireland semi-final stage where they played the Leinster winners.
 The winners of the Munster Championship advanced directly to the second All-Ireland semi-final.  
 The winners of the Ulster Championship advanced directly to the second All-Ireland semi-final where they played the Munster champions.

Results

Leinster Senior Hurling Championship

First round

Semi-finals

Final

Munster Senior Hurling Championship

First round

Semi-finals

Final

All-Ireland Senior Hurling Championship

Semi-finals

Final

References

Sources
 Corry, Eoghan, The GAA Book of Lists (Hodder Headline Ireland, 2005).
 Donegan, Des, The Complete Handbook of Gaelic Games (DBA Publications Limited, 2005).

See also

1945